Klasa C represents the ninth and lowest level of the Polish football hierarchy. The existence of the Klasa C is not common in Poland. In the 2020-21 season, the above-mentioned league existed only in the Lesser Poland and Silesian voivodships. Teams promoted from Klasa C move up to Klasa B.

From 2008 to 2010, the Klasa C was the tenth level in the Lesser Poland.

References 

9